The Commission on Security and Cooperation in Europe (CSCE), also known as the U.S. Helsinki Commission, is an independent U.S. government agency created by Congress in 1975 to monitor and encourage compliance with the Helsinki Final Act and other Organization for Security and Co-operation in Europe (OSCE) commitments.  It was initiated by House representative Millicent Fenwick and established in 1975 pursuant to Public Law No. 94-304 and is based at the Ford House Office Building.

Function and duties of Commission
The commission is authorized and directed to monitor the acts of the signatories which reflect compliance with or violation of the articles of the Final Act of the Conference on Security and Cooperation in Europe, with particular regard to the provisions relating to human rights and Cooperation in Humanitarian Fields. The commission is further authorized and directed to monitor and encourage the development of programs and activities of the United States Government and private organizations with a view toward taking advantage of the provisions of the Final Act to expand east–west economic cooperation and a greater interchange of people and ideas between East and West.

Abstract
The Commission consists of nine members from the U.S. House of Representatives, nine members from the United States Senate, and one member each from the Departments of State, Defense, and Commerce. The positions of chairman and co-chairman are shared by the House and Senate and rotate every two years, when a new Congress convenes. A professional staff assists the Commissioners in their work.

The Commission contributes to the formulation of U.S. policy toward the OSCE and the participating states and takes part in its execution, including through Member and staff participation on official U.S. delegations to OSCE meetings and in certain OSCE bodies. Members of the Commission have regular contact with parliamentarians, government officials, NGOs, and private individuals from other OSCE participating states.

The Commission convenes public hearings and briefings with expert witnesses on OSCE-related issues; issues public reports concerning implementation of OSCE commitments in participating States; publishes a periodic Digest with up-to-date information on OSCE developments and Commission activities; and organizes official delegations to participating States and OSCE meetings to address and assess democratic, economic, and human rights developments firsthand.

History
In February 2018, the CSCE convened in Washington, DC to address the issue of Russian doping in international sport. Central to the discussion was an exploration of the need to protect whistleblowers. The meeting included testimony from Jim Walden, attorney for Dr. Grigory Rodchenkov, the former head of Russia's anti-doping laboratory who defected to the US.

On 1 July 2022 Ranking Member Sen. Roger Wicker (MS) and Minister of Foreign Affairs of Romania Bogdan Aurescu co-chaired a conference on Euro-Atlantic security called "BLACK SEA SECURITY SUMMIT". 

On 17 October 2022, while the Russian invasion of Ukraine was in full swing, the Commission called for the State Department to submit a motion to the United Nations to end the status of Russia as a permanent member of the U.N. Security Council. This initiative was seen as a further step in the campaign of Ukrainian Ambassador to the U.N. Sergiy Kyslytsya to unseat Russia.

On 14 December 2022, in a bi-partisan effort, the co-chair of the commission Steve Cohen and the ranking member of the commission Joe Wilson submitted resolution 1517 to the House of Representatives wherein they recapitulated that Russia had committed "flagrant violations" of the U.N. Charter that call into question its right to hold a Security Council seat, and would urge President Biden, inter alia, "to direct the Department of State and other relevant Federal departments and agencies to pursue all appropriate steps with Allies, partners, and other countries to limit, suspend, or terminate the participation or membership of the Russian Federation in other organs and specialized agencies of the United Nations".

Commissioners

Commissioners, 116th Congress

Commissioners, 115th Congress

Commissioners, 114th Congress

Commissioners, 113th Congress

Commissioners, 112th Congress

Commissioners, 111th Congress

Commissioners, 110th Congress

Commissioners, 109th Congress

Commissioners, 108th Congress

Commissioners, 107th Congress

Commissioners, 106th Congress

Commissioners, 105th Congress

Commissioners, 104th Congress

Commissioners, 103rd Congress

Commissioners, 102nd Congress

Commissioners, 101st Congress

Commissioners, 100th Congress

Commissioners, 99th Congress

Commissioners, 98th Congress

Commissioners, 97th Congress

Commissioners, 96th Congress

Commissioners, 95th Congress

Commissioners, 94th Congress

Historical leadership

United States Code reference
Title 22, Chapter 45

Commission on Security and Cooperation in Europe

. Commission on Security and Cooperation in Europe; establishment
. Function and duties of Commission
. Commission membership
. Testimony of witnesses, production of evidence; issuance of subpoena; administration of oaths
. Report relating to Commission on Security and Cooperation in Europe
. Commission report to Congress; periodic reports; expenditure of appropriations
. Appropriations for Commission
. Commission staff
. Printing and binding costs

References

External links
Commission on Security and Cooperation in Europe

United States federal boards, commissions, and committees
Foreign relations of the United States
Organization for Security and Co-operation in Europe
1975 establishments in the United States